Samy Awad (born 7 September 1960) is an Egyptian modern pentathlete. He competed at the 1984 Summer Olympics, finishing in 36th place in the individual event.

References

External links
 

1960 births
Living people
Egyptian male modern pentathletes
Olympic modern pentathletes of Egypt
Modern pentathletes at the 1984 Summer Olympics
20th-century Egyptian people